USS Nausett may refer to  the following ships of the United States Navy:

 , a light draft monitor, built by Donald McKay, South Boston, Massachusetts
 USS Nausett (YT-35), the second name of wooden tug ; renamed on 24 November 1920
 , a tanker completed in April 1918 by the Bethlehem Shipbuilding Corp., Alameda, California
 , originally a mine planter for the U.S. Army; transferred to the U.S. Navy in March 1951
 

United States Navy ship names